La Virtù trionfante dell'amore e dell'odio overo Il Tigrane (RV 740) is a 1724 opera for the carnival season in Rome. It was a joint composition by Benedetto Micheli (Act I), Vivaldi (Act II) and Nicola Romaldi (Act III). The libretto was originally thought to based on that by Francesco Silvani already used in Venice in 1691, but has been identified as a libretto by Pietro Andrea Bernardoni used in Vienna in 1710.

Recordings
Complete Act II - Mónika González (soprano), Ildikó Szakács (soprano), Artur Stefanowicz (countertenor), Barnabás Heygi (countertenor), Timothy Bentch (tenor), Zsolt Molnár (baritone) & László Jekl (bass) Savaria Baroque Orchestra Pál Németh  Hungaroton
"Squarciami pure il seno" (Cleopatra) - by Simone Kermes on Amor Profano; also Regula Mühlemann on  Cleopatra, La Folia Barockorchester, Robin Peter Müller 2017
"Fara la mia spada" (Oronte) - Philippe Jaroussky, Heroes  Jean-Christophe Spinosi
"Care pupille" Topi Lehtipuu on Arie per tenore Diego Fasolis Naive Vivaldi Edition; also by Nicholas Scott Un jardin à l'italienne Les Arts Florissants

See also
Tigrane (Hasse)

References

Operas
1724 operas
Operas by Antonio Vivaldi